John Quinlan may refer to:
 John Quinlan (bishop), Irish Catholic bishop
 John Quinlan (wrestler), American actor and professional wrestler
 John M. Quinlan, member of the Massachusetts Senate
 Jack Quinlan, American sportscaster
 John Ross Quinlan, computer science researcher